The Jaqué River is a river in the Darién Province of southern Panama. It flows generally westward from its source in the Darién National Park to the town of Jaqué, where it enters the Pacific Ocean.

See also
List of rivers of Panama

External links
OpenStreetMap - Darién
CIA map, 1995.

Rivers of Panama